Olympia is the second studio album by Canadian electronic music band Austra, released on June 17, 2013, by Domino. Olympia spawned three singles: "Home", "Painful Like" and "Forgive Me". The album received largely positive reviews from critics, who said that it had more "bombastic throb" compared to its predecessor while still showcasing lead singer Katie Stelmanis's "classically trained, massive voice", adding that it was "clean, considered, with every detail in its place and a clear sense of its own identity."

Background and development
In an interview for the music blog Stereogum, Stelmanis said that she began writing Olympia while still touring in support of the band's debut studio album, Feel It Break. According to her, writing Olympia took about a year, and the actual recording, in the studio in Michigan, four to five weeks. Her vocals were recorded in Montreal with Damian Taylor and then sent to be mixed to Tom Elmhirst. Stelmanis told Interview magazine that the album is titled after the newborn child of the owners of the studio where they recorded, where Austra was "the first band into the studio after the baby was born".

She also told Stereogum that the band was more focused on the quality of the sound than before and that every song on Olympia "was hand-picked in a very thoughtful way." On various occasions she noted that Olympia was a more collaborative record than its predecessor, which, in her own words, "was pretty much a bedroom project".

Stelmanis states that the primary inspiration for Olympia were the "early house music tracks" like "Chicago house and Detroit" and Marshall Jefferson's song "Move Your Body" in particular to which Stelmanis was listening to a lot. She was inspired by the fact that such music, according to her, was created without any electronic instruments and therefore actually played (as opposed to computer-generated music where computers generate the sounds of the composition – which was also the case with their previous album Feel It Break). This inspired the band to play live instruments, therefore Olympia has a more organic and natural feel. Stelmanis also cited Portishead's album Third as an influence.

Critical reception

Olympia received generally positive reviews from music critics. At Metacritic, which assigns a normalized rating out of 100 to reviews from mainstream publications, the album received an average score of 76, based on 26 reviews.

The album was a longlisted nominee for the 2014 Polaris Music Prize.

Track listing

Personnel
Credits adapted from the liner notes of Olympia.

Austra
 Katie Stelmanis – vocals, synths, programming, piano, recorder
 Maya Postepski – keyboards, programming, percussion, drums, marimba, organ
 Dorian Wolf – bass, synth

Additional musicians

 Romy Lightman – backing vocals
 Sari Lightman – backing vocals
 Ryan Wonsiak – saxophone, keyboards
 Alia Hamdon-O'Brien – flute
 Anna-Sophia Vukovich – violin
 Ewan Kay – trombone

Technical

 Austra – production
 Mike Haliechuk – additional production
 Bill Skibbe – recording 
 Leon Taheny – recording ; additional recording 
 Damian Taylor – vocal production, vocal recording
 Tom Elmhirst – mixing
 Ben Baptie – mix engineering
 Joe Visciano – mixing assistance
 Guy Davie – mastering

Artwork
 Norman Wong – all photography

Charts

Release history

Notes

References

2013 albums
Austra (band) albums
Domino Recording Company albums
Paper Bag Records albums